Dale is an unincorporated community in Caldwell County, Texas, United States.  The settlement had a population of 500 in 2000. It is located within the Greater Austin metropolitan area.

History
Dale was named for the valley in which it is located. The Missouri, Kansas and Texas Railroad arrived in 1880 and the town's post office was granted that same year. Within five years, Dale had a population of 75. The town had three stores, a gristmill, and a cotton gin, which shipped cotton into the community. By 1914, Dale had a population of 250 and 15 businesses, but this declined to 200 between 1925 and 1943. The 1936 county highway map showed several homes, two churches, several businesses, and a seasonal industry in the community. Dale reached its population zenith in 1947 with 275 residents but then decreased to 126 from 1970 to the early 1990s. It had 14 businesses at that time. Its most recent population estimate was 500 in 2000. Its population then shrunk back to 126 in 2010.

Although it is unincorporated, Dale has a post office, with the ZIP code of 78616.

In December 2013, a 47-year-old man from Moundville, Alabama, was shot and killed by three men while watching over a relative's home who was hospitalized nearby. They attempted to rob the home. All three men were arrested and charged with the murder, as well as aggravated assault and tampering with evidence.

On September 19, 2017, an Islamic cemetery in Dale was vandalized, and the suspect is unknown. On January 4, 2018, a man was killed when a train collided with his car as he attempted to cross the tracks in front of a Union Pacific train.

On February 2, 2018, a Caldwell County Sheriff's deputy was shot by two residents while responding to a theft/robbery call in Dale. He was taken to the hospital and is currently undergoing recovery. The two people who shot the deputy have pleaded self-defense as they thought he was an intruder. Their charges were later dropped. Residents had problems with the shooters before the incident, such as being threatened by the woman in the home and the man would come out with a gun at times. One resident said that shootings are common in Dale, and that police had been called to their home numerous times before the incident.

On June 17, 2018, a man bit the rattle off of a rattlesnake and released it into a neighbor's home as revenge for an earlier dispute. The suspect, Felton Ryan Saunter, was charged with deadly conduct and trespassing.

A possible murder occurred in Dale on November 21, 2019, with 53-year-old Howard Orozco Harris as a suspect.

Geography

Education
In 1905, Dale had a school with 112 students and two teachers. On the 1936 county highway map, it had two schools. Today the community is served by the Lockhart Independent School District.

Notable people
 Azie Taylor Morton, the only African American to serve as Treasurer of the United States.
 Jimmy Weldon, entertainer.
 Geraldine Elizabeth Carmichael was arrested in Dale while working under the alias Katherine Elizabeth Johnson at a flower shop. She had been on the run after defrauding many people who'd wanted to purchase a small fuel-efficient car that had never begun production; by coincidence, the car in question was also called the "Dale".
 Abram Lincoln Harris, economist, academic, anthropologist.

References

Unincorporated communities in Caldwell County, Texas
Unincorporated communities in Texas